Diaphus termophilus, the Taaning's lantern fish, is a species of lanternfish. It occurs in all oceans between about 52°N and 48°S.

Size

References

Myctophidae
Fish of the Atlantic Ocean
Fish of the Indian Ocean
Fish of the Pacific Ocean
Taxa named by Åge Vedel Tåning
Fish described in 1928